Camas High School is an American public high school located in Clark County, in the city of Camas, Washington. The principal is Kelly O'Rourke.

It has a grade span of 9th through 12th, and contains a total of 2,063 students as of March 2018. It is operated by the Camas School District and includes a complement of 90 classroom teachers. The Camas High School colors are red, black, and white, the mascot is a Mean Machine, and their team name is the Papermakers.

Demographics

As of the 2016 school year, Camas High School contained 50.6% male students and 49.4% female students. Student ethnicity:  0.4% Native American/Alaskan Native; 6.9% Asian; 0.9% African American; 7.4% Hispanic; 77.0% Caucasian; and 7.1% two or more races. The average years of teacher experience was 11.1. The percentage of teachers with at least a  master's degree was 84.4%. The dropout rate for the 2008/2009 school year was 1.1%, with a 92.5% on-time graduation rate. As of May 2010, 10.2% of students were enrolled in some sort of special education program.
In the 2012/2013 school year, CHS had 1,893 students. 50.8% were male while 49.2% were female. The student body this year was 0.4% American Indian/Alaskan Native, 6.4% Asian, 0.6% Pacific Islander, 1.2% Black, 5.9% Hispanic, 80.1% White, and 5.3% of two or more races.

Academics

CHS hosts a total of 156 total classes, as well as close to 15 different special education classes.

All students are required to take four years of American English, two years of science, three years of mathematics, two arts classes, an occupational education class, and a physical education class. Incoming freshmen also take an orientation course to learn study, research, and technological skills, unless they are students in the school's Math, Science, and Technology Magnet Program. Students have the option of taking at-level courses, Pre-Advanced Placement, or regular Advanced Placement courses for many subjects in each grade level.

CHS also hosts programs such as Advanced Placement (AP) classes, as well as the ability to take advanced classes at nearby Clark College through taking such exams as Running Start, which when completed, will provide college money and credit for students. Another program at Camas High School is the STEM (Science, Technology, Engineering, and Math) Magnet program. CHS also has developed a Robotics Magnet program, known as CamTech.

Also supported is the Senior Project, which is a program completed by seniors in which students must apply skills they have learned to a culminating project and paper of, totaling at least 40 hours of work. Students often use this as a way to pursue their interests in individual projects or as job shadows of professionals in the community, or benefit their community through charity or community service work. Failure to complete the project and accompanying paper will result in the inability to graduate on time.

Athletics
Camas High School supports athletics, competing in the Greater St. Helens League of WIAA District IV in wrestling, boys' and girls'  swimming, girls' volleyball, girls' dance, boys' and girls' basketball, football, baseball, cross country, softball, boys' and girls' golf, boys' and girls' tennis, girls bowling,  track and field, boys' and girls' soccer, and girls' gymnastics.  Their team name is the Papermakers, and their mascot is a humanized mechanical paper-rolling machine, which commemorates the town's founding industry, the production of paper goods at the Georgia Pacific paper mill.

State championships
 Boys' soccer: 2006, 2008, 2011
 Football:  2016, 2019
 Girls' Cross Country: 2011, 2012, 2014, 2015
 Girls' Soccer: 2005, 2016, 2021
 Girls' Tennis: 1977, 2022
 Softball: 2002
 Boys' Swimming: 2017, 2018
 Gymnastics: 2018, 2019, 2020
 Boys' Track & Field 2018
 Boys' Cross Country 2019

Extracurricular activities
Clubs

Besides sports, CHS also supports various clubs and non-sporting teams. Some major clubs include Key Club International, DECA, FIRST Robotics Competition Team 2471, the National Honor Society, FCCLA, an award-winning Mock Trial team, Science Olympiad, in which Camas is a National contender, and Knowledge Bowl, in which Camas is a state contender.

Camas High School also operates school programs, such as yearbook, the Camasonian (the school newspaper), and various plays (including a fall production, a spring musical, and student-directed productions). The drama department has a policy of not repeating a play once it has been performed.

Controversies
In February 2020, Principal Liza Sejkora remarked on the death of former professional basketball player Kobe Bryant on her Facebook page, writing, "Not gonna lie, seems to me that karma caught up with a rapist today." Immediately following that post, students protested and organized a walkout; while Sejkora issued an apology and was placed on administrative leave by the school board.
 
In December 2021, A letter was released by Eric Knox, a high school basketball coach from Portland, Oregon's Benson High School, detailing racist language used by Camas High School students against Benson High players. This letter triggered an internal investigation, ending with a public apology from the Camas School District school board, admitting to racism from Camas High School students.

In April 2022, The Camas High School junior varsity (JV) baseball team was under investigation for allegedly using racist words during a match against Skyview High School's JV team at Camas High School on April 20.
During that game, witnesses alleged that some Camas JV players made racist comments and noises.

Notable alumni
 Michael R. Barratt
 Greg Biffle
 Alexa Efraimson
 Denis Hayes
 Brent Richards
 Jimmie Rodgers
 Taylor Williams

References

Sources
Camas High School main page
Camas School District
Camas High School Report Card

External links
 GSHL Football - Camas High School
 Camas High School - GreatSchools
 http://camaschoir.org/

High schools in Clark County, Washington
Public high schools in Washington (state)
Magnet schools in Washington (state)
Camas, Washington